Victor Fernandez (23 March 1939 – 17 February 2020) was an Argentine football player and manager who was caretaker manager of the Australian national team in 1992 and  manager of Samoa from 2001 to 2002.

Personal life and playing career

Fernandez was born in 1939 in Argentina. In Argentina, he played for River Plate, San Lorenzo, and Deportivo Español, before moving to Australia and playing from 1963 to 1969 for Budapest, which became known as St George-Budapest during his time there, and in 1977 for Canberra City.

He died on 17 February 2020 in Argentina.

Managerial career

In Australia, Fernandez moved into management, and coached teams including Canberra City, Inter Monaro, and Canberra Metro. While coaching Canberra Metro in 1992, he was caretaker manager of the Australian national team for two A international games, one each against Malaysia and Indonesia, and two B internationals, one each against Thailand's and South Korea's youth teams. They won one and lost one of each category. Fernandez went on to coach the Samoan national side from 2001 to 2002.

Managerial statistics

References

External links
Vic Fernandez's profile on ozfootball.net

Australia national soccer team managers
Samoa national football team managers
1939 births
2020 deaths
Argentine expatriate football managers
Argentine footballers
Club Atlético River Plate footballers
San Lorenzo de Almagro footballers
Deportivo Español footballers
St George FC players
Canberra City FC players
National Soccer League (Australia) players
Association football midfielders